The 36th Annual American Music Awards were held on November 23, 2008 at the Nokia Theatre L.A. Live in Los Angeles, California. The ceremony was hosted by Jimmy Kimmel. The nominations were announced on October 11, 2008.

Performers

Presenters

 Jamie Foxx
 Sarah Chalke
 Akon
 Julianne Hough
 Ashley Tisdale
 David Archuleta
 Demi Lovato
 Kate Walsh
 Paris Hilton
 T-Pain
 Jordin Sparks
 Scott Weiland
 Daughtry
 Billy Ray Cyrus
 Mötley Crüe
 Terrence Howard
 Nick Lachey
 Aretha Franklin
 Steven Tyler
 Joe Perry
 Richie Sambora
 Colbie Caillat
 David Cook
 The-Dream
 Enrique Iglesias
 LL Cool J
 Jesse McCartney
 Nickelback
 Solange
 Shailene Woodley
 Lance Bass
 Justin Timberlake

Winners and nominees

References

2008
2008 music awards
2008 awards in the United States
2008 in California